Ng Yen Yen (born 10 April 1946) is a Malaysian politician who had served in the Cabinet of Malaysia as Minister of Women, Family and Community Developmment from 2008 to 2009 and Minister of Tourism from 2009 to 2013. Her appointment as a full minister marked a milestone as the first Malaysian Chinese woman to hold a cabinet position.

Ng was the first woman to be elected to the position of Vice-President of Malaysian Chinese Association (MCA) from 2008 to 2013. Earlier she was the chief of the Women's wing of the MCA until 2008.

Early life
Ng is a Kelantan native who was born in Kampung Kubang Pasu, Kota Bharu. As a teenager, she had to give tuition to finance her Form Six education at the Victoria Institution in Kuala Lumpur.

Her father, who was old-fashioned, wanted to marry her off when she was 17 years old. However, her mother stepped in and made sure Ng completed her education to highest level she aspired.

Ng obtained a scholarship from the State Government of Kelantan and then graduated from Universiti Malaya in 1972 with a Bachelor of Medicine, Bachelor of Surgery (MBBS). She was also awarded a Diploma of Reproductive medicine from the Johns Hopkins University in the United States.

She was awarded an honorary doctorate by Josai International University (ranked 252nd in Japan) on 4 September 2012 for her "significant contributions in tourism industry development, nation building and forging of closer relations and cooperation between the university and Malaysia".

Family
Dr. Ng is married to Dr. Cheang Chee Sue and has three children, all of whom are successful professionals.

Political involvement
Dr. Ng, was Kelantan Wanita MCA chairman and the national MCA vice-president, the first woman to be elected to the post. She was a former Deputy Culture, Arts and Tourism Minister, and Deputy Finance Minister (2003 and 2008).

Member of Parliament
She was first elected as Member of Parliament of the constituency of Raub in 1999. She retained her parliamentary seat in the 2004 and 2008 elections. She was not renominated as the candidate for the parliamentary seat in the 2013 elections.

Bukit Koman, an area under the Raub parliamentary constituency of which Ng is the member of, is notorious for its gold mining activity. Villagers of Kampung Bukit Koman have been facing health and environment problems after a gold mine operator started using cyanide in the extraction method.

During the 2008 elections, Ng who was seeking her third term as MP for Raub, said she saw the gold mining project in Bukit Koman as a way of developing Raub into a tourist town and generating other economic activities much like the Australian city of Ballarat, where its legacy of wealth from the 19th century gold rush is still visible today.

"If the mine is not safe, I will be the first one to ask for its closure," the Wanita MCA chief stressed.

However, when villages approached Ng three months after the election, she has been reported to say that there is no cause for concern for the villagers of Bukit Koman, saying that she had already looked into the matter three years ago. At least 300 villagers, including the elderly and children, have complained of suffering from different medical symptoms due to cyanide. Ng has been criticised for her care-less attitude towards the villagers.

Senatorship
Before being elected as a member of parliament in Dewan Rakyat, she was a senator in the Dewan Negara. She was recommended to be a senator by the then MCA deputy president Lim Ah Lek. Her senatorship was from the Pahang state government under MCA's quota and her candidacy had to be endorsed by the Pahang State Executive Council and Legislative Assembly. Ng took her oath of office as a senator in August 1993.

Ng's senatorship was scrutinised and it was found that she was a permanent resident of Australia when she took the oath of loyalty to the Yang DiPertuan Agong and country to be appointed a senator. Before receiving her senatorship she had declared herself as a permanent resident of Australia in documents filed with the Australian authorities. She was still an Australian PR in between 1990 and 1995 during her tenure as a Malaysian Senator. Ng chose Tusmore, Adelaide, South Australia as her place of residence and had been living in Australia for approximately three years.

In Australia, Ng teamed up with Soh Chee Wen, General (Rtd) Mohamed Ngah Said and two Australians to run stock-broking business via New South Wales-based company, Indo Pacific Securities Limited, from April 1992 through May 1995. She was a director of the company from April 1992 until she resigned in May 1995. In an interview to Malaysiakini, Ng said she revoked her permanent residency in 1995, in her second year of senatorship, as she need not travel to Australia that frequently any more. Thus, she said the question of her 'dual citizenship' does not hold any more.

Ng has said that she obtained the PR status to facilitate her frequent travelling to Australia to look after her three sons who "were in their early formative years and studying there".

Lim Ah Lek, the person who had recommended Ng for the senatorship, has said that he was misled and regretted his decision, saying:

"Recommending someone who holds a PR in a foreign country for a senatorship brings disrepute to the Senate, and in this case, also to the Pahang exco and to the Legislative Assembly. I am shocked to learn about what was reported... I need to clarify this as my reputation is at stake,"''

Rais Yatim, the then de facto Law Minister of Malaysia, commended that Dr Ng Yen Yen's past status as an Australian permanent resident while serving as senator was "morally untenable" though it is not legally wrong.

Ministerial positions

Minister of Women, Family and Community Development
Dr. Ng is the first Malaysian Chinese woman to hold a cabinet position and only the second minister in charge of the Ministry of Women, Family and Community Development. She said her new job was more than handling women issues as it invariably also included men, children and the community.

She said she intended to have more participation from Malaysian men because they "made up the equation" where it would lead to strong families being formed and subsequently a better nation.

Among her initial plans are to educate the community on gender equality, beginning at school level; create a gender-friendly environment for working women; improve community development by working closely with the relevant non-governmental organisations; and also addressing issues faced by elderly women. Dr. Ng said she would meet with her predecessor Datuk Seri Shahrizat Abdul Jalil to seek her advice.

Minister of Tourism
On 9 April 2009, she was appointed Minister of Tourism in Prime Minister Datuk Seri Najib Tun Razak's new cabinet. Under her stewardship, Malaysia was rated the ninth most popular tourist destination by United Nations World Tourism Organization (UNWTO). In 2011, Malaysia received 24.8 million tourists, generating RM58.3 billion in tourism receipts. The ministry also spent RM 1.8 million on a Facebook marketing campaign to promote tourism.

One of her first few concerns as Tourism Minister was to promote the Homestay programme whereby tourists will get to stay in villages and experience the true essence of Malaysia's rural lifestyle. Her approach increased the numbers and earned the Ministry of Tourism Malaysia the coveted UNWTO Ulysses Award for Innovation in Public Policy and Governance for the Malaysia Homestay Experience Programme on 15 Nov 2012.

To keep tourist numbers rolling in, she launched new programmes and events, specifically targeting different segments of the tourism market. As a natural extension of the successful "Malaysia Truly Asia" brand, she launched the "Fabulous Food 1 Malaysia" event, a 3-month promotion campaign (Oct to Dec) highlighting Malaysia's gourmet, restaurants and street food. Malaysians generally are proud of their wide variety of food choices, the result of their multi-ethnic and multi-cultural heritage.

Other new programmes aimed at increasing the tourism receipts are the Malaysian International Shoe Festival (MISF), and the Malaysian Contemporary Arts Tourism Festival. Banking on Malaysia's well known shoe designer, Jimmy Choo, the Malaysian International Shoe Festival is fast gaining recognition for Malaysia as the Shoe Capital of the East.

The Malaysian Contemporary Art Tourism Festival (Jul–Sept) gave much needed spark of life to the local art scene. With the Ministry's focus on contemporary art promotion, the interest, awareness and appreciation for art is growing steadily. The ultimate objective is to attract foreign tourists to invest in Malaysia's contemporary art. This should not be too difficult in light of CNN's rating for Kuala Lumpur as the fourth most popular shopping destination in the world after New York, Tokyo and London.

Dr. Ng is a firm believer in responsible tourism and believes that tourism protects, preserves and conserves Mother Nature. One of Malaysia's key attractions is eco-tourism, notably Sipadan Island, which is often credited as the top dive site in the world. Additionally, the recent visit by the Duke and Duchess of Cambridge, William and Kate, to Danum Valley, one of the verdant green sanctuaries in Malaysia has created a lot of publicity and awareness for Malaysia's ecotourism attractions.

2014 was designated as Visit Malaysia Year.

Gastronationalist controversy
In 2009, as part of a national food branding exercise, Ng attempted to claim exclusivity and national ownership for regional dishes such as Laksa, Hainanese Chicken Rice and Bak Kut Teh, claiming that others have "hijacked their dishes". This led to discontent with its regional neighbours, particularity in countries such as Indonesia, Singapore and Thailand. Ng later clarified that she was misquoted on her intention to patent the foods, and that a study on the origins of the foods would be conducted "and an apology conveyed if it was wrongly claimed." No such study ever occurred.

Election results

Honours
  :
  Commander of the Order of Loyalty to the Crown of Malaysia (PSM) - Tan Sri (2014)
  :
  Knight Commander of the Order of the Crown of Kelantan (DPMK) - Dato' (2004)
  :
  Grand Commander of the Exalted Order of Malacca (DGSM) - Datuk Seri (2010)
  :
  Knight Companion of the Order of the Crown of Pahang (DIMP) - Dato’ (1997)
 Knight Companion of the Order of Sultan Ahmad Shah of Pahang (DSAP) - Dato’ (2003)
  Grand Knight of the Order of Sultan Ahmad Shah of Pahang (SSAP) - Dato’ Sri (2008)
  :
  Knight Commander of the Order of the Crown of Perlis (DPMP) - Dato' (2003)

References

External links
 

|-

 
 

1946 births
Living people
People from Kota Bharu
People from Kelantan
Malaysian politicians of Chinese descent
Malaysian Christians
Malaysian medical doctors
Malaysian Chinese Association politicians
Government ministers of Malaysia
Women government ministers of Malaysia
Members of the Dewan Rakyat
Women members of the Dewan Rakyat
Members of the Dewan Negara
Women members of the Dewan Negara
Women in Pahang politics
University of Malaya alumni
Johns Hopkins University alumni
Malaysian expatriates in Australia
Commanders of the Order of Loyalty to the Crown of Malaysia
21st-century Malaysian politicians
21st-century Malaysian women politicians